Manyad Dam, is an earthfill dam on Manyad river near nandre Chalisgaon, Jalgaon district in state of Maharashtra in India.

Specifications

Purpose
 Irrigation

See also
 Dams in Maharashtra
 List of reservoirs and dams in India

References

Dams in Jalgaon district
Dams completed in 1973
1973 establishments in Maharashtra